Jakobínarína were an Icelandic six-piece indie-punk band from Hafnarfjörður near Reykjavik. 

Jakobinarina were formed by Ágúst Fannar Ásgeirsson, Björgvin Ingi Pétursson, Gunnar Bergmann, Hallberg Dadi Hallbergsson, Heimir Gestur Valdimarsson and Sigurdur Möller Sívertsen in 2004 when they were at school and gained attention and success after they won the Icelandic version of Battle of the Bands, Músíktilraunir in 2005. In 2006, they performed at the South by Southwest festival, and released their first EP His Lyrics Are Disastrous on Rough Trade Records. They toured Britain and in 2007, they signed to Parlophone and released their debut album The First Crusade. In the autumn of 2007 they toured Europe and the United States but by the following February, the band had folded. They played a final concert on 8 March 2008.

Band members 

 Gunnar Bergmann Ragnarsson – lead vocals
 Hallberg Daði Hallbergsson — guitar, backing vocals
 Heimir Gestur Valdimarsson — guitar
 Ágúst Fannar Ásgeirsson — keyboards
 Björgvin Ingi Pétursson — bass guitar
 Sigurður Möller Sívertsen — drums

Discography 
Singles:
2006: "His Lyrics Are Disastrous " (Original Release) - 31 July 2006
2007: "Jesus " - 21 May 2007
2007: "This Is An Advertisement" - 23 July 2007
2007: "His Lyrics Are Disastrous" - 24 September 2007

Albums:
2007: The First Crusade - 1 October 2007

References

External links
 

Musical groups established in 2004
Musical groups disestablished in 2008
Icelandic punk rock groups